The 2020 Meralco Bolts season was the 10th season of the franchise in the Philippine Basketball Association (PBA).

Key dates
December 8, 2019: The 2019 PBA draft took place in Midtown Atrium, Robinson Place Manila.
March 11, 2020: The PBA postponed the season due to the threat of the coronavirus.
April 13, 2020: After playing two seasons with the franchise, long-time national team player Ranidel de Ocampo announces his retirement from professional basketball.

Draft picks

Roster

Philippine Cup

Eliminations

Standings

Game log

|-bgcolor=ffcccc
| 1
| October 12
| Phoenix
| L 98–116
| Reynel Hugnatan (16)
| Raymar Jose (10)
| Chris Newsome (5)
| AUF Sports Arena & Cultural Center
| 0–1
|-bgcolor=ccffcc
| 2
| October 14
| Alaska
| W 93–81
| Allein Maliksi (17)
| Reynel Hugnatan (8)
| Chris Newsome (5)
| AUF Sports Arena & Cultural Center
| 1–1
|-bgcolor=ffcccc
| 3
| October 18
| Ginebra
| L 91–105
| Allein Maliksi (18)
| Reynel Hugnatan (7)
| Baser Amer (6)
| AUF Sports Arena & Cultural Center
| 1–2
|-bgcolor=ccffcc
| 4
| October 20
| Magnolia
| W 109–104 OT
| Chris Newsome (23)
| Cliff Hodge (9)
| Chris Newsome (6)
| AUF Sports Arena & Cultural Center
| 2–2
|-bgcolor=ccffcc
| 5
| October 23
| NLEX
| W 101–92
| Chris Newsome (18)
| Raymond Almazan (9)
| Chris Newsome (6)
| AUF Sports Arena & Cultural Center
| 3–2
|-bgcolor=ffcccc
| 6
| October 28
| San Miguel
| L 82–89
| Baser Amer (17)
| Newsome, Black (8)
| Chris Newsome (6)
| AUF Sports Arena & Cultural Center
| 3–3

|-bgcolor=ccffcc
| 7
| November 4
| Blackwater
| W 89–85
| Chris Newsome (19)
| Raymond Almazan (10)
| Bong Quinto (6)
| AUF Sports Arena & Cultural Center
| 4–3
|-bgcolor=ccffcc
| 8
| November 5
| Rain or Shine
| W 85–78
| Chris Newsome (17)
| Almazan, Black (9)
| Baser Amer (7)
| AUF Sports Arena & Cultural Center
| 5–3
|-bgcolor=ffcccc
| 9
| November 7
| TNT
| L 79–92
| Chris Newsome (17)
| Raymond Almazan (9)
| Newsome, Hugnatan (4)
| AUF Sports Arena & Cultural Center
| 5–4
|-bgcolor=ccffcc
| 10
| November 8
| Terrafirma
| W 95–93
| Raymond Almazan (15)
| Raymond Almazan (10)
| Cliff Hodge (5)
| AUF Sports Arena & Cultural Center
| 6–4
|-bgcolor=ccffcc
| 11
| November 11
| NorthPort
| W 80–73
| Bong Quinto (14)
| Jammer Jamito (12)
| Baser Amer (7)
| AUF Sports Arena & Cultural Center
| 7–4

References

Meralco Bolts seasons
Meralco Bolts